Ceresium is a genus of beetle in the family Cerambycidae.

Species 
The following species and subspecies are accepted within Ceresium:
 Ceresium affinis (Gahan, 1900) 
 Ceresium annulicornis (Germar, 1848) 
 Ceresium binotatum
 Ceresium brevipes
 Ceresium casilelium
 Ceresium clarkei
 Ceresium compressipenne
 Ceresium coronarium
 Ceresium cribrum
 Ceresium cylindricellum
 Ceresium decorum
 Ceresium discicolle
 Ceresium diversum
 Ceresium epilais
 Ceresium flavicorne 
 Ceresium flavipes (Fabricius, 1792) 
 Ceresium furtivum
 Ceresium geniculatum
 Ceresium gracilipes
 Ceresium grandipenne
 Ceresium guamum
 Ceresium guamum subsp. rotanum 
 Ceresium guttaticolle
 Ceresium guttaticolle subsp. yapense
 Ceresium humerale
 Ceresium inerme
 Ceresium kimberley Slipinski & Escalona, 2016 
 Ceresium lanigera
 Ceresium lanuginosum
 Ceresium larvatum
 Ceresium leprosum
 Ceresium lieftincki
 Ceresium lineigerum Pascoe, 1888 
 Ceresium lucidum
 Ceresium maculaticolle
 Ceresium minor (Blackburn, 1894) 
 Ceresium miserum
 Ceresium mjoebergi Aurivillius, 1917 
 Ceresium nakatae
 Ceresium nanyoanum
 Ceresium nigroapicale
 Ceresium nigrum Gahan, 1888 
 Ceresium nitidicolle
 Ceresium obscurum
 Ceresium olidum
 Ceresium pachymerum (Pascoe, 1869) 
 Ceresium planatum
 Ceresium promissum
 Ceresium pubescens
 Ceresium quadrimaculatum Gahan, 1900 
 Ceresium rainwaterae
 Ceresium raripilum Newman, 1842 
 Ceresium repandum
 Ceresium robustum 
 Ceresium rouyeri
 Ceresium rufipes
 Ceresium saipanicum
 Ceresium scutellaris
 Ceresium seminigrum Aurivillius, 1917 
 Ceresium signaticolle
 Ceresium simile
 Ceresium simplex (White, 1855) 
 Ceresium striatipenne
 Ceresium sublucidum
 Ceresium sventivanyi
 Ceresium testaceum
 Ceresium thyra
 Ceresium tibiale
 Ceresium unicolor
 Ceresium unicolor subsp. marshallum
 Ceresium usingeri
 Ceresium vacillans
 Ceresium vile (Newman, 1841) 
 Ceresium virens
 Ceresium vitticolle
 Ceresium vulneratum
 Ceresium yoshinoi

References

Callidiopini
Beetles described in 1842
Cerambycidae genera